The 1996–97 Club Atlético Boca Juniors season was the 67th consecutive Primera División season played by the senior squad.

Summary
Macri reinforced the club with several players: Diego Latorre, Julio César Toresani, Néstor Lorenzo, Sandro Guzmán, Facundo Sava, Sebastián Rambert, Gabriel Cedrés, Diego Cagna, Mauricio Pineda, Hugo Guerra, Silvio Carrario, Fernando Cáceres and Christian Dollberg. Owing to health issues club star Diego Maradona took another retirement. Meanwhile, forward Claudio Paul Caniggia suffered his mother' suicide in Henderson  and announced his own retirement for the next Apertura Tournament. Also, left winger Kily González, Juan Sebastián Verón were transferred out to Europe. 17-yr-old playmaker and future club legend Juan Román Riquelme made his debut in this Apertura tournament.

In Apertura Tournament, the squad was a total failure sinking down to the middle of the table far below of champions River Plate prompting Bilardo to be sacked during December.

In spite of rumors about Miguel Ángel Brindisi as new trainer, the club appointed Héctor Veira as new head coach and reinforced the squad with goalkeeper Roberto Abbondanzieri (returned from a loan Rosario Central), midfielder Christian Traverso, Alfredo Berti and Pedro González. However, in Clausura the team just reached a miserable ninth spot despite Sergio "Manteca" Martinez scored 15 goals being the Clausura top striker. Finally, by July 13 Diego Maradona came back from his brief retirement and played against Racing  for the joy of Boca fans.

Special uniforms 
Alternate kits worn only in 1997 Supercopa Libertadores

Squad

Transfers

January

Competitions

Torneo Apertura

League table

Position by round

Matches

Torneo Clausura

League table

Position by round

Matches

Statistics

Players statistics

References

Boc
Club Atlético Boca Juniors seasons